Kohat Pass is a mountain pass in the North-West Frontier Province of Pakistan, between the cities of Kohat and Peshawar. The pass traverses the Khigana Mountains, which stretch from the Federally Administered Tribal Areas towards Attock.

British authorities in Peshawar commenced construction of the Kohat Pass road in 1849, and completed it by 1850 despite violent opposition from local tribes. The pass was closed temporarily in 1853 after a quarrel arose among nearby tribes. The road which connected Kohat to Rawalpindi via Khushalgarh was of little trouble compared to the Kohat Pass road.

Travel times across the pass were dramatically reduced with the opening of the Kohat Tunnel in 2003.

See also
Khyber Pass

References

External links
Pictures of Kohat and the pass

Kohat District
Peshawar